Chahar Taq (also Romanized as Chāhār Ţāq; also known as Chāţāq) is a village in Kuhestan Rural District, Qaleh Chay District, Ajab Shir County, East Azerbaijan Province, Iran. At the 2006 census, its population was 235, in 49 families.

References 

Populated places in Ajab Shir County